Broad Creek Hundred is a hundred in Sussex County, Delaware, United States. Broad Creek Hundred was formed in 1775 from Somerset County, Maryland. Its primary community is Bethel.

References

Hundreds in Sussex County, Delaware